Phloeonemus is a genus of cylindrical bark beetles in the family Zopheridae. There are at least three described species in Phloeonemus.

Species
These three species belong to the genus Phloeonemus:
 Phloeonemus catenulatus Horn, 1878
 Phloeonemus interruptus Reitter, 1877
 Phloeonemus martorelli Fisher

References

Further reading

 
 
 

Zopheridae
Articles created by Qbugbot